The UT Arlington Mavericks baseball team is a varsity intercollegiate athletic team of the University of Texas at Arlington in Arlington, Texas, United States. The team is a member of the Western Athletic Conference, which is part of the National Collegiate Athletic Association's Division I. The team plays its home games at Clay Gould Ballpark in Arlington, Texas. The Mavericks are coached by Clay Van Hook.

History

The UTA Mavericks began intercollegiate baseball in 1969 as the Athletic Department moved from the College Division to the University level, which required schools to sponsor more sports than UTA did at that time. As the only founding member of the Southland Conference to not offer the sport, UTA immediately had a conference home.

Tom Beasley became UTA's first head coach. After two losing seasons, Fred Mathews Took the helm and guided the Mavericks to their first winning season and a second-place finish in the SLC. He coached for two more seasons before a legend would guide the Mavericks for the next 26 seasons.

Butch McBroom amassed 756 wins, which is by far the most for any Maverick coach and still second all-time in the Southland. His teams won two Conference Championships, were runners-up six times and participated in two NCAA tournaments. He occasionally landed in national rankings as well. His players earned four pitcher-of the-year awards, one player of-the-year, one hitter-of-the-year and three newcomer-of-the-year while he, himself, won four coach-of-the-year honors.

In 1994, the Mavericks finished four games under .500, breaking a streak of 14-straight winning seasons. It marked the first of six-consecutive sub-.500 years, until he retired after the 1999 season.

Clay Gould was hired as the fourth coach in Maverick history. He played for the Mavericks in the early 1990s during their two NCAA tournament runs and was named the 1993 Southland Conference Player-of-the-Year. His first year was a rebuilding year, but in 2001, UTA won their first Southland Conference tournament and advanced to the NCAA tournament.

Against the Houston Cougars, Craig Martin, who retired as UTA's all-time hits leader and is still currently UTA's all-time doubles leader, hit a late-inning home run to win UTA's first NCAA tournament game. UTA's two losses were to host Rice University, which advanced to the Super Regional.

During the season, Coach Gould was battling colon cancer, and he died shortly after the season ended.

Jeff Curtis succeeded Coach Gould in 2002 and in 2006, UTA won their second Southland Conference tournament.

Former Head coach Darin Thomas, who was an assistant coach under Clay Gould and associate head coach with Jeff Curtis, officially took the reins in 2008. In 2012, his team won the Southland Conference Tournament to advance to an NCAA regional for the fifth time in program history. In 2013, as the team played their first and last season in the Western Athletic Conference, the team was co-champions with California State University-Bakersfield. In 2017, the team won a program record 20 conference games en route to a West Division championship in the Sun Belt.

Since 2013, the baseball team annually plays one game against a Division I opponent in Globe Life Park.

Season-by-season results

See also
 List of NCAA Division I baseball programs

References

External links